Spittal is a small hamlet in Caithness, Scottish Highlands and is in the Scottish council area of Highland. The main A9 road runs past Spittal.

Industry
A nearby electrical substation is the landing point for a 1,200 MW high-voltage direct current submarine power cable to Blackhillock Substation near Keith, Moray in northeast Scotland, crossing the Moray Firth. Another cable from Shetland is planned to reach Spittal.

References

Populated places in Caithness